The Pierce County School District is a public school district in Pierce County, Georgia, United States, based in Blackshear. It serves the communities of Blackshear, Bristol, Jot Em Down Store, Mershon, Offerman, Otter Creek, Patterson and Waycross.

Schools
The Pierce County School District has three elementary schools, one middle school, and one high school.

High school
Pierce County High School

Middle school
Pierce County Middle School

Elementary schools
Blackshear Elementary School
Midway Elementary School
Patterson Elementary School

References

External links

School districts in Georgia (U.S. state)
Education in Pierce County, Georgia